Red pipefish may refer to one of the following species of fish:

Notiocampus ruber
Festucalex erythraeus
Microphis mento